Sir Roger Newdigate's Prize, more commonly the Newdigate Prize, is awarded to students of the University of Oxford for the Best Composition in English verse by an undergraduate who has been admitted to Oxford within the previous four years. It was founded in 1806 as a memorial to Sir Roger Newdigate (1719–1806). The winning poem is announced at Encaenia. Instructions are published as follows: "The length of the poem is not to exceed 300 lines. The metre is not restricted to heroic couplets, but dramatic form of composition is not allowed." It is one of the many prizes awarded by this university to students and graduate students.

Overview
The first winner was John Wilson ("Christopher North"). Notable winners have included Robert Stephen Hawker, John Ruskin, Matthew Arnold, Laurence Binyon, Oscar Wilde, John Buchan, John Addington Symonds, James Fenton, James Laver, P. M. Hubbard, and Alan Hollinghurst.

The parallel award given at the University of Cambridge is the Chancellor's Gold Medal.

Past titles and winners
Where known, the title of the winning poem is given, followed by the name of the author, each year links to its corresponding "[year] in poetry" article:

Notable 19th-century winners
 1827: Pompeii. Robert Stephen Hawker
 1829: Voyages of Discovery to the Polar Regions. Thomas Legh Claughton
 1830: The African Desert. George Kettilby Rickards
 1834: The Hospice of St. Bernard. Joseph Arnould
 1837: The Gypsies. Arthur Penrhyn Stanley
 1838: The Exile of St. Helena. Joseph Henry Dart
 1839: Salsette and Elephanta. John Ruskin
 1843: Cromwell. Matthew Arnold
 1844: Battle of the Nile. Joseph Lloyd Brereton
 1845: Petra. John William Burgon
 1852: The Feast of Belshazzar. Sir Edwin Arnold
 1853: The Ruins of Egyptian Thebes. Samuel Harvey Reynolds
 1857: The Temple of Janus. Philip Stanhope Worsley
 1860: The Escorial. John Addington Symonds
 1868: The Catacombs. John Alexander Stewart
 1875: David Livingstone. George Earle Buckle
 1877: John Brooks
 1878: Ravenna. Oscar Wilde
 1880: Raleigh. Rennell Rodd
 1883: John Bowyer Buchanan Nichols
 1887: Sakya-Muni: The Story of Buddha. Sidney A. Alexander
 1888: Gordon in Africa. Arthur Waugh
 1898: The Pilgrim Fathers. John Buchan
 1890: Persephone. Laurence Binyon
 1900: Robespierre. Arthur Carré

20th century
 1901: Galileo. William Garrod
 1902: Minos. Ernest Wodehouse
 1903: not awarded
 1904: Delphi. George Bell
 1905: Garibaldi. Arthur E. E. Reade
 1906: The Death of Shelley. Geoffrey Scott
 1907: Camoens. Robert Cruttwell
 1908: Holyrood. Julian Huxley
 1909: Michelangelo. Frank Ashton-Gwatkin
 1910: Atlantis. Charles Bewley
 1911: Achilles. Roger Heath
 1912: Richard I Before Jerusalem. William Chase Greene
 1913: Oxford. Maurice Roy Ridley
 1914: The Burial of Sophocles. Robert William Sterling
 1915: not awarded
 1916: Venice. Russell Green
 1917: suspended due to war
 1918: suspended due to war
 1919: France. P. H. B. Lyon
 1920: The Lake of Garda. George Johnstone
 1921: Cervantes. James Laver
 1922: Mount Everest. James Reid
 1923: London. Christopher Scaife
 1924: Michelangelo. Franklin McDuffee
 1925: Byron. Edgar McInnis
 1926: not awarded
 1927: Julia, Daughter of Claudius. Gertrude Trevelyan
 1928: The Mermaid Tavern. Angela Cave
 1929: The Sands of Egypt. Phyllis Hartnoll
 1930: Daedalus. Josephine Fielding
 1931: Vanity Fair. Michael Balkwill
 1932: Sir Walter Scott. Richard Hennings
 1933: Ovid among the Goths. Philip Maitland Hubbard
 1934: Fire. Edward Lowbury
 1935: Canterbury. Allan Plowman
 1936: Rain. David Winser
 1937: The Man in the Moon. Margaret Stanley-Wrench
 1938: Milton Blind. Michael Thwaites
 1939: Dr Newman Revisits Oxford. Kenneth Kitchin
 1940–1946: suspended due to war
 1947: Nemesis. Merton Atkins
 1948: Caesarion. Peter Way
 1949: The Black Death. Peter Weitzman
 1950: Eldorado. John Bayley
 1951: The Queen of Sheba. Michael Hornyansky
 1952: Exile. Donald Hall (published in OP 1953)
 1953: not awarded
 1954: not awarded
 1955: Elegy for a Dead Clown. (Edwin) Stuart Evans
 1956: The Deserted Altar. David Posner
 1957: Leviathan. Robert James Maxwell
 1958: The Earthly Paradise. Jon Stallworthy
 1959: not awarded
 1960: A Dialogue between Caliban and Ariel. John Fuller
 1961: not awarded
 1962: May Morning. Stanley Johnson
 1963: not awarded
 1964: Disease. James Hamilton-Paterson
 1965: Fear. Peter Jay
 1966: not awarded
 1967: not awarded
 1968: The Opening of Japan. James Fenton
 1969: not awarded
 1970: Instructions to a Painter. Charles Radice
 1971: not awarded
 1972: The Ancestral Face. Neil Rhodes
 1973: The Wife's Tale. Christopher Mann
 1974: Death of a Poet. Alan Hollinghurst
 1975: The Tides. Andrew Motion
 1976: Hostages. David Winzar
 1977: The Fool. Michael King
 1978: not awarded
 1979: not awarded
 1980: Inflation. Simon Higginson
 1981: not awarded
 1982: Souvenirs. Gordon Wattles
 1983: Triumphs. Peter McDonald (published in OP I.2)
 1984: Fear. James Leader
 1985: Magic. Robert Twigger
 1986: An Epithalamion. William Morris
 1987: Memoirs of Tiresias. Bruce Gibson and Michael Suarez (joint winners)
 1988: Elegy. Mark Wormald
 1989: The House. Jane Griffiths
 1990: Mapping. Roderick Clayton
 1991: not awarded
 1992: Green Thought. Fiona Sampson
 1993: The Landing. Caron Röhsler
 1994: Making Sense. James Merino
 1995: Judith with the Head of Holofernes. Antony Dunn (published in OP IX.1)
 1996: not awarded
 1997: not awarded
 1998: not awarded
 1999: not awarded

21st century
 2000: A Book of Hours.
 2005: Lyons. Arina Patrikova
 2006: BEE-POEMS. Paul Thomas Abbott
 2007: Meirion Jordan
 2008: Returning, 1945. Rachel Piercey
 2009: Allotments, Arabella Currie
 2010: The Mapmaker's Daughter, Lavinia Singer
 2011: not awarded
 2012: not awarded
 2013: Edgelands, Daisy Syme-Taylor
 2014: The Centrifuge, Andrew Wynn Owen
 2015: not awarded
 2016: Sinai, Mary Anne Clark
 2017: Borderlines, Dominic Hand (published in Oxford Poetry XVII.i)
2018: not awarded
2019: not awarded
2020: the summer critter speaks not of frost., Rachel Ka Yin Leung
 2021: Koinobionts, Annabelle Fuller

See also
List of British literary awards
List of literary awards
List of poetry awards
List of years in literature
List of years in poetry
Oxford Poetry
Prizes named after people

References 
Notes

Sources
 Richter, editor, Annie J. (1946). Literary Prizes and Their Winners. R. R. Bowker Co.

1806 establishments in the United Kingdom
Awards and prizes of the University of Oxford
Awards established in 1806
British poetry awards